Tân Hoà may refer to:

Tân Hòa, Bà Rịa–Vũng Tàu, Vietnam
Tân Hoà, Bắc Giang, Vietnam